Oltiariq District is a tuman (district) of Fergana Region in Uzbekistan. The capital lies at the town Oltiariq. The district consists of one city (Tinchlik), 14 urban-type settlements (Oltiariq, Chinor, Azimobod, Boʻrbaliq, Djurek, Zilxa, Katput, Oqboʻyra, Povulgʻon, Poloson, Chordara, Eskiarab, Yangiarab, Yangiqoʻrgʻon) and 15 rural communities.

References

Districts of Uzbekistan
Fergana Region